Waghjān bazar (alternatively Vagdzhan or Vaghjān) is a village in Logar Province, in eastern Afghanistan.

References

Populated places in Logar Province